Matoaca may refer to:

People
 Pocahontas, Matoaca Rebecca Rolf
 Matoaca Gay, 19th Century United States society writer and Shakespeare scholar

Other
 Matoaca, Virginia, a census-designated place (CDP) in Chesterfield County, Virginia, United States
 Matoaca High School, a secondary school in Matoaca, Virginia